Wikishuffle was a UK comedy podcast presented by Jack Stewart, Chris Wallace and Philip Sharman, reliant on the Wikipedia random article button for content.

On 12 September 2015 Wikishuffle was awarded the title of Best Comedy Podcast at the 2015 UK Podcasters Awards hosted by New Media Europe.

Format 

The subject material for the podcast is determined by pressing the random article button in the English Wikipedia. Each episode features between one and four articles discussed by the host, with excerpts read directly from the article and commented upon. New episodes are released every Tuesday with occasional bonus episodes focusing on articles chosen by the presenters or suggested by listeners.

The podcast is hosted by Jack Stewart, who is also responsible for the technical and editing duties. Philip Sharman takes responsibility for reading out the articles, while Chris Wallace provides interjections. The tone is generally humorous, but the show also covers serious articles, such as the 2011 San Fernando massacre, and discusses political and current affairs topics in the context of the random articles that are selected.

The show also features more general news items in relation to Wikipedia and advocates the importance of the site as an educational and societal resource, and encourages listeners to donate to the Wikimedia Foundation.

The format is dependent upon a high level of listener interaction, with communication encouraged via social media and through the post.

Various running jokes have been established, including the prevalence of moth articles, the disproportionate number of articles covered which make reference to Scranton, Pennsylvania and Sharman's age and inability to keep up-to-date with popular culture and modern technologies.

History 

Stewart and Wallace began podcasting in early 2015, with a podcast called Not This Again, recorded in Stewart's spare room The show was interview based and, after the pair began to find difficulty in securing a regular supply of interviewees, they started to look for an alternative format to differentiate them from the large number of independent podcasts available.

Philip Sharman had been a guest on Not This Again and spoke with Stewart and Wallace about an idea he had for developing a Wikipedia podcast. The initial idea was for a serious, documentary style podcast, using the random article button to seed stories. However, it became clear that the three presenters were better suited to a more lighthearted approach, resulting in the development of the current format.

The first three episodes were released together on 14 April 2015, hosted by the Swedish podcasting service Acast.

In August 2015, the recording of the podcast moved from Corby to a dedicated recording studio in Kettering, Northamptonshire, referred to in the podcast as Wikishuffle HQ.

The 50th episode of Wikishuffle was released on 2 February 2016. On 24 January 2017 the podcast celebrated its 100th episode with a special 2 hour long entry featuring articles selected by the presenters. In episode 101 it was announced that Jack would be leaving the podcast indefinitely to go find himself in Asia. Two more episodes were released with friend of the show Ruth Bradley filling in for Jack, and has not updated since. The final episode was released on 28 March 2017.

Critical response

Wikishuffle has received favourable reviews from an international audience.

On 12 September 2015 Wikishuffle won the Best Comedy Podcast category at the inaugural UK Podcasters Awards hosted by New Media Europe  sponsored by Spreaker. The award was accepted by Wallace and Sharman at the ceremony which took place at the Midland Hotel, Manchester.

Articles covered 

The following Wikipedia articles have been covered by Wikishuffle:

References

External links 
 

Audio podcasts
Comedy and humor podcasts
British podcasts
2015 podcast debuts
Works about Wikipedia
2017 podcast endings